Roberto Thostrup (born 7 August 1942) is an Argentine alpine skier. He competed in three events at the 1968 Winter Olympics.

References

1942 births
Living people
Argentine male alpine skiers
Olympic alpine skiers of Argentina
Alpine skiers at the 1968 Winter Olympics
Sportspeople from Bariloche